Charles Darwin School is the only secondary school in the Biggin Hill area of the London Borough of Bromley, England. The school consists of 1,320 secondary and sixth form students. Currently the head teacher is Mr Aston Smith. The school has recently received a good in an October 2013 Ofsted inspection. GCSE results have demonstrated continued year-on-year improvement to 69.4% A*-C including English and maths, with 90% 5 GCSE good grades. At A-level 82% of 6th formers gained A-C grades.

The school is London's most southerly school and has a catchment including schools from Bromley, Croydon, Kent and Surrey. Public transport to the school is via 320, 664, 69, 464, R8, R2 and 246 bus routes.

The school is also a creative arts college, and is locally renowned for their annual school productions. In July 2014, they put on an end of year production of The Demon Headmaster produced by Kian Hollis.The school has a thriving sporting community where pupils have  represented and have won events at Kent County level in boys and girls football, rugby and cricket. A number of pupils have represented at England U18 football, Olympic diving and Premier league football. The school facilities include a gym and an all-weather astro-turf football pitch.

References

External links 
Official web site

Academies in the London Borough of Bromley
Secondary schools in the London Borough of Bromley
Educational institutions established in 1974
1974 establishments in England